Nikolay Valeryevich Markov (born 20 April 1985) is a Russian professional association football player. He plays for FC Yenisey Krasnoyarsk.

Career
In December 2009, Markov signed a 2-year contract with FC Krasnodar. He made his Russian Premier League debut for Krasnodar on 14 May 2011 in a game against FC Tom Tomsk.

On 28 February 2015, Markov moved to FC Ural Sverdlovsk Oblast for the rest of the season.

Career Stats

References

External links
 

1985 births
Sportspeople from Tashkent
Living people
Russian footballers
Association football defenders
Traktor Tashkent players
FC Rubin Kazan players
FC Metallurg Lipetsk players
FC Lukhovitsy players
FC Salyut Belgorod players
FC Krasnodar players
FC Ural Yekaterinburg players
FC Krasnodar-2 players
FC Kuban Krasnodar players
FC Yenisey Krasnoyarsk players
Russian Premier League players
Russian First League players
Russian Second League players